This is a list of Azerbaijani painters.

A–K

 Ahad Hosseini
 Alakbar Rezaguliyev
 Ali Ibadullayev
 Arif Huseynov
 Asaf Jafarov
 Aydin Rajabov
 Ayyub Huseynov
 Azim Azimzade
 Bahruz Kangarli
 Boyukagha Mirzazade
 Denyon Peacock
 Elbey Rzaguliyev
 Farhad Khalilov
 Fuad Abdurahmanov
 Geysar Kashiyeva
 Haydar Hatemi
 Jalal Garyaghdi
 Kazem Ordoobadi

L–Z

 Maral Rahmanzadeh
 Mikayil Abdullayev
 Mirza Gadim Iravani
 Museyib Amirov
 Sattar Bahlulzade
 Semyon Bilmes
 Shmavon Mangasarov
 Togrul Narimanbekov
 Tahir Salahov
 Ujal Hagverdiyev
 Usta Gambar Karabakhi
 Vidadi Narimanbekov

See also

 Azerbaijani people
 Art of Azerbaijan

Painters
Azerbaijan